Colonel Roosevelt (2010) is a biography of U.S. President Theodore Roosevelt written by author Edmund Morris released on November 23, 2010.  It is the third volume of a trilogy, following the Pulitzer Prize-winning The Rise of Theodore Roosevelt (1979) and Theodore Rex (2001).

Colonel Roosevelt covers the years after Theodore Roosevelt leaves the presidency in 1909 to his death in 1919.

References
Morris, Edmund. (2010).  Colonel Roosevelt New York: Random House.  
C-SPAN Q&A interview with Morris on his Roosevelt trilogy, November 21, 2010

2010 non-fiction books
American biographies
Books about Theodore Roosevelt
Random House books